2011 was the fourth competitive season for the Cairns based Skill360 Northern Pride Rugby League Football Club. They competed in the QRL state competition, the Intrust Super Cup. 12 clubs competed, with each club playing 22 matches (11 home and 11 away) over 25 weeks.

Between Round 14 of the 2010 season and Round 5 of the 2011 season, the Pride won 17 consecutive games, a Queensland Cup record. After a draw in Round 6 and a win in Round 7, the Pride were unbeaten after 19 matches. They finished the 2011 season in second place, but were eliminated after losing the semi-final 26–20 to Tweed Heads Seagulls at Dolphin Oval, Redcliffe.

2011 Season –  Skill360 Northern Pride

Staff
 Coach: David Maiden
 Assistant coaches: David Westley & Cameron Miller
 Team captain: Ty Williams
 Club captain: Ben Laity
 Chief executive: Chris Sheppard
 Chairman: Bob Fowler

 Competition: Intrust Super Cup

2011 Player awards
 Northern Pride Player of the Year – Jason Roos
 Most improved player – Ben Spina
 Best back player – Brett Anderson
 Best forward player – Luke Harlen
 Club Person of the Year – Chey Bird
 Australia Day Awards, 25 January 2011: Senior Sports Person Award – Chris Sheppard

2011 Player records
 (Records to end of the 2011 season)
 Most Games – Ben Laity 96, Mark Cantoni 89, Chey Bird 85, Jason Roos 81, Joel Riethmuller 67.
 Most Points – Chey Bird 542, Tom Humble 174, Rod Jensen 136, Ryan Stig 128, Brett Anderson 116.
 Most Tries – Rod Jensen 34, Brett Anderson 29, Mark Cantoni 25, Chey Bird 22, Tom Humble 20.

 Brett Anderson scored 15 tries this season – the highest try scorer for the Pride and the third highest in the Intrust Super Cup this season.
 Chey Bird scored 198 points this season – 4 tries and 91 goals. He was the second highest point scorer in the Intrust Super Cup this season.

2011 player gains
  Ty Williams from North Queensland Cowboys
  Aidan Day from North Queensland Cowboys
  Luke Harlen from Cronulla Sharks
  Lancen Joudo from Cronulla Sharks
  Ryan Ghietti from Redcliffe Dolphins
  Mick Wilson from Redcliffe Dolphins
 Shaun Nona from CDRL Tully Tigers
 Sheldon Powe-Hobbs from CDRL Kangaroos (Cairns) RLFC
 Francis Mosby from CDRL Kangaroos (Cairns) RLFC / Pride Academy
 Luke Saunders from CDRL Southern Suburbs
 Davin Crampton from Normanton

Player losses after 2010 season
  Chris Sheppard (Captain 2008–2010) retired
  Ryan Stig to NRL Newcastle Knights 
  Jaiman Lowe to NRL South Sydney Rabbitohs 
  Rod Griffin to Queensland Cup Tweed Heads Seagulls 
  Nick Slyney to Queensland Cup Redcliffe Dolphins 
  Jamie Frizzo retired to become coach of CDRL Ivanhoes Knights)
  Chris Riesen to CDRL Brothers (Cairns)
  Drew Campbell to CDRL Brothers (Cairns)

2011 Season Launch
 Public launch, Saturday 16 March 2011.
 Corporate launch, Monday 14 March 14, 2011, Cairns Colonial Club, Manoora.

Pre Season Boot Camp

 Djarragun Farm in the Goldsborough Valley – 18–19 December 2010. 110 players and coaching staff from all three squads (Intrust Super Cup, Under-18 and Under-16) attended the boot camp.

2011 Jerseys

Special playing strips
 2011: NAIDOC Week green jersey worn in Round 15, Friday 8 July 2010 at Barlow Park for the game against the Burleigh Bears.
 2011: Special NPA indigenous jersey designed by Mario Assan for the Round 20 game played on Saturday 20 August 2011 at Yusia Ginau Oval, Bamaga, Queensland against Souths Logan Magpies. The design incorporates:
The five communities of the NPA Region: Injinoo, Umagico, Bamaga, New Mapoon and Seisia, the communities are represented on the five dots on the boomerang.
The five tribes the Traditional Owners of the NPA Anggamuthi, Atambaya, Wuthati, Yadhaykenu and Gudang. The tribes are depicted through the five rivers that stream from the bottom of the boomerang.
The main centrepiece of the design the Torres Strait Headress (Dhari) traditionally known as a Dhibal, is from Saibai Island, which makes up the majority of the TSI population in the NPA which migrated to the NPA throughout the 1940s. The Dhari as a significant importance in TSI culture, the initiation of young men into warriors, celebrated through dance and ceremonies.
The boomerang represents the Aboriginal peoples of the NPA, used in hunting and gathering and significant ceremonies

Trial Matches

Intrust Super Cup matches

Ladder

Finals Series

2011 Northern Pride players

North Queensland Cowboys who played for the Northern Pride in 2011

Clint Amos and Will Tupou were switched from being allied to the Northern Pride to the Mackay Cutters after Round 6 as part of the North Queensland Cowboys feeder agreement.

2011 Televised Games
In 2011 games were televised by ABC TV and shown live across Queensland through the ABC1 channel at 2.00pm (AEST) on Saturday afternoons. The commentary team was Gerry Collins, Warren Boland and David Wright.
 1: Northern Pride drew 12–12 : Round 6, Saturday 23 April 2011 against Ipswich Jets from North Ipswich Reserve, Ipswich
 2: Northern Pride lost 12–26 : Round 11, Saturday 4 June 2011 against Tweed Heads Seagulls from Piggabeen Sports Complex, Tweed Heads
 3: Northern Pride lost 28–30 : Round 13, Saturday 18 June 2011 against Wynnum-Manly Seagulls from BMD Kougari Oval, Brisbane
 4: Northern Pride lost 20–26 : Semi-Final, Saturday 17 September 2011 against Tweed Heads Seagulls from Dolphin Oval, Redcliffe

References

External links
 Northern Pride Official site
 Northern Pride Facebook Page
 Northern Pride Twitter Page
 Northern Pride YouTube Page
 2011 Northern Pride match video highlights

Northern Pride RLFC seasons
2011 in Australian rugby league
2011 in rugby league by club